Berkut Hockey Club (HC Berkut) was a Ukrainian professional ice hockey team based in Brovary. While its home arena is in Brovary, within the Kyiv region, it also played in the city of Kyiv.

It was a founding member of the Professional Hockey League of Ukraine, before being expelled by the League and forfeited from the 2013 playoffs. The organization's current focus is its youth development program.

The team's name, Berkut, means golden eagle.

History

Financial dispute
The team was expelled by the League and forfeited from the 2013 playoffs for not fulfilling its financial obligations to the League and to its players. Its former captain, Serhiy Klymentiev, along with goaltender Igor Karpenko filed a lawsuit against the club at the conclusion of the season. It has since not taken part in the 2013–14 Ukrainian Hockey Championship season.

Name change
On 26 January 2014, it was announced that HC Berkut-2, a Ukrainian ice hockey team in the Amateur Hockey League would be changing so as to avoid association with Berkut forces in their role repressing Euromaidan activists.

Players

Team captains
  Roman Malov 2011 – 2012
  Serhiy Klymentiev 2012 – 2013

Head coaches
  Dmytro Markovsky, 2011 – 2012
  Miloš Holaň, 2012 – present

References

External links
Team History

Ice hockey teams in Ukraine
Sport in Kyiv
Sport in Brovary
Professional Hockey League teams